Doug Magor (24 May 1947 – 11 January 1969) was an Australian rules footballer who played with South Melbourne and Footscray in the Victorian Football League (VFL) during the 1960s.

Magor was a reserves player at South Melbourne before breaking into the senior in 1967. He made his first appearance in a drawn game with Carlton at Lake Oval and played six further times that year. The following season he crossed to Footscray but would play only two games. He kicked his only career goal on his Footscray debut, against North Melbourne at Arden Street.

In January 1969, Magor was killed in a car accident.

References

1947 births
1969 deaths
Sydney Swans players
Western Bulldogs players
Road incident deaths in Australia
Australian players of Australian rules football